David John Grundy (born 24 December 1963) is a retired New Zealand field hockey player, who finished in eighth position with the New Zealand Men's National Team (nicknamed the Black Sticks) at the 1992 Summer Olympics in Barcelona, Spain. Born in Hokitika, Grundy played 38 tests for New Zealand.

References
 New Zealand Olympic Committee

External links
 

New Zealand male field hockey players
Field hockey players at the 1992 Summer Olympics
Olympic field hockey players of New Zealand
1963 births
Living people
People from Hokitika